Tony Kurtz (born December 23, 1966) is an American businessman and politician.  He is a Republican member of the Wisconsin State Assembly, representing Juneau County and parts of northern Sauk and Richland counties.

Biography

He is the CEO of Kaynick Solutions. Kurtz served in the Wisconsin State Assembly since January 2019 and is a Republican. He ran for Wisconsin's 3rd congressional district in 2014 and lost to Democratic incumbent Ron Kind.

Kurtz lives on a farm with his wife and family in Wonewoc, Wisconsin. He went to Troy State University and Embry–Riddle Aeronautical University. Kurtz served in the United States Army.

In the 2020 election, Kurtz voted for Donald Trump.

In 2021, Kurtz supported a Republican proposal to reduce taxes in Wisconsin by $2.8 billion;

References

1966 births
Living people
People from Wonewoc, Wisconsin
Military personnel from Wisconsin
Businesspeople from Wisconsin
Farmers from Wisconsin
Embry–Riddle Aeronautical University alumni
Troy University alumni
Republican Party members of the Wisconsin State Assembly
21st-century American politicians